An obscene phone call is an unsolicited telephone call where a person uses profane and/or sexual language to interact with someone who may be known to them or may be a complete stranger. Making obscene telephone calls for sexual arousal or other sexual pleasure is known as telephone scatologia and is considered a form of exhibitionism. 

Telephone scatologia is usually classed as a paraphilia from a psychiatric viewpoint. It is in the DSM-5 as an other specified paraphilic disorder. Related psychiatric terms (such as coprophonia) were coined in Australia, the United States, and Germany; most of the pertinent literature is North American. From the viewpoint of the recipient of the calls, obscene calls may be considered to be a form of sexual harassment, stalking, or both. 

In some U.S. states, making obscene telephone calls is a Class 1 Misdemeanor. In the United Kingdom, obscene phone calls are punishable by a fine of up to £5,000 or up to six months in prison under the Criminal Justice and Public Order Act of 1994.

Generally, unwilling recipients of obscene phone calls are advised to simply hang up on obscene callers and then report the incident to the telephone company or the police.  Even when Caller ID is not shown, calls are logged by the telephone company, so the perpetrator's phone number can be discovered. However, many people who regularly engage in obscene phone calls use payphones or prepaid cell phones, and in these cases, a more extensive investigation is necessary. The prevalence of internet telephony, and sophisticated international operations have also stymied the investigation of nuisance phone calls. 

The demographic that most commonly commits obscene phone calls ranges from the age of 12 to 16 years, with an average of 14 years of age. Often they are emotionally or behaviorally maladjusted and have shown previous signs of sexual abuse, as well as having already committed sexual abuse. Obscene phone callers are often male, feel inadequate, have feelings of isolation, have trouble forming relationships and consider making obscene phone calls to be the only way that they can sexually express themselves.

See also
 Courtship disorder
 Dirty talk
 Phone sex
 Prank call
 Sexual harassment
 Strip search phone call scam

References

External links
 Why do some men make obscene phone calls?
 Fact Sheet 3: How to Put an End to Unwanted or Harassing Phone Calls

Crimes
Paraphilias
Sex crimes
Telephone crimes
Obscenity
Stalking